Vladimir Borisovich Yankilevsky (Russian: Владимир Борисович Янкилевский) (February 15, 1938 in Moscow – January 4, 2018 in Paris) was a Russian artist known mostly for his participation in the Soviet Nonconformist Art movement of the 1960s through the 1980s. Perhaps his most famous works are his triptychs, works that are difficult to classify, occupying a unique middle ground between painting, and sculpture, similar in some ways to Rauschenberg's combines. On the most basic level, these works use disorienting, often nightmarish imagery to paint a picture of restrictive mental states associated with daily life in the Soviet Union, and with the human condition in general. He is also known for having participated in the Manezh Art Exhibit of 1962, during which Nikita Khrushchev famously chastised the Nonconformist Art Movement as degenerate. 
Yankilevsky last lived in Paris, France with his wife Rimma.

Bibliography
Yankilevsky, Vladimir. The State Russian Museum Presents: Vladimir Yankilevsky. Moment of Eternity. (Exh. cat.). Yevgenia Petrova. St. Petersburg: Palace Editions, 2007.  (International)
 The Experimental Group: Ilya Kabakov, Moscow Conceptualism, Soviet Avant-Gardes By Matthew Jesse Jackson
 Forbidden Art: The Postwar Russian Avant-garde, Art Center College of Design (Pasadena, Calif.), Gosudarstvennyĭ russkiĭ muzeĭ (Saint Petersburg, Russia), Curatorial Assistance, Incorporated, 1998 Original from	the University of Michigan Digitized	Nov 9, 2007 , 9781881616917 Length	326 pages

References

External links
 Official Website (new)
 Official Website (old)
 JJG collection of Russian Art since 1960

1938 births
2018 deaths
20th-century Russian painters
Russian male painters
21st-century Russian painters
Soviet Nonconformist Art
Russian contemporary artists
20th-century Russian male artists
21st-century Russian male artists
Artists from Moscow